Hawthorne is a borough in Passaic County, in the U.S. state of New Jersey. As of the 2020 United States census, the borough's population was 19,637, an increase of 846 (+4.5%) from the 2010 census count of 18,791, which in turn reflected an increase of 573 (+3.1%) from the 18,218 counted in the 2000 census.

Hawthorne was originally part of the now-defunct Manchester Township, which was later subdivided to create Hawthorne, Haledon, North Haledon, Prospect Park, Totowa, The Heights/Columbia Heights District of Fair Lawn and most of the First Ward of Paterson. The Borough of Hawthorne was incorporated from portions of Manchester Township by an act of the New Jersey Legislature on March 24, 1898. The borough was named for novelist Nathaniel Hawthorne.

Geography

Unincorporated communities, localities and place names located partially or completely within the borough include Goffle, North Hawthorne and Van Winkle.

The borough borders North Haledon, Prospect Park, and Paterson in Passaic County; and Fair Lawn, Glen Rock, Ridgewood and Wyckoff in Bergen County.

Demographics

2010 census

The Census Bureau's 2006–2010 American Community Survey showed that (in 2010 inflation-adjusted dollars) median household income was $72,985 (with a margin of error of +/− $6,585) and the median family income was $83,136 (+/− $7,364). Males had a median income of $64,906 (+/− $7,150) versus $44,641 (+/− $2,852) for females. The per capita income for the borough was $33,872 (+/− $1,921). About 4.9% of families and 7.1% of the population were below the poverty line, including 11.4% of those under age 18 and 7.2% of those age 65 or over.

Same-sex couples headed 48 households in 2010, a 50% increase from the 32 counted in 2000.

2000 census
As of the 2000 United States census there were 18,218 people, 7,260 households, and 4,929 families residing in the borough. The racial makeup of the borough was 93.75% White, 0.75% African American, 0.14% Native American, 1.89% Asian, 0.02% Pacific Islander, 1.58% from other races, and 1.88% from two or more races. Hispanic or Latino of any race were 7.43% of the population.

There were 7,260 households, out of which 28.8% had children under the age of 18 living with them, 54.1% were married couples living together, 10.3% had a female householder with no husband present, and 32.1% were non-families. 26.5% of all households were made up of individuals, and 11.1% had someone living alone who was 65 years of age or older. The average household size was 2.50 and the average family size was 3.07.

In the borough the population was spread out, with 21.8% under the age of 18, 6.5% from 18 to 24, 33.5% from 25 to 44, 22.7% from 45 to 64, and 15.5% who were 65 years of age or older. The median age was 38 years. For every 100 females, there were 91.1 males. For every 100 females age 18 and over, there were 87.7 males.

The median income for a household in the borough was $55,340, and the median income for a family was $65,451. Males had a median income of $46,270 versus $33,277 for females. The per capita income for the borough was $26,551. About 2.6% of families and 3.4% of the population were below the poverty line, including 4.0% of those under age 18 and 5.4% of those age 65 or over.

Government

Local government

The Borough of Hawthorne is governed under the Faulkner Act, formally known as the Optional Municipal Charter Law, within the Mayor-Council system of municipal government. The township is one of 71 municipalities (of the 564) statewide that use this form of government. The governing body is comprised of the Mayor and the seven-member Borough Council. A Charter Study Commission, formed in the 1980s after two major commercial businesses left the borough, led to a recommendation for the adoption of a Mayor-Council form in which there are four wards to give residents a representative in each area of the community, in addition to a mayor and two at-large members of the borough council, all of whom are directly elected by residents, with all members of the governing body serving four-year terms of office. After residents approved the commission's recommendations, the first election under the Mayor-Council form was held in 1989. The four ward seats are up for vote together and the three at-large seats and the mayoral position up for vote together two years later. All elections are held on a partisan basis as part of the November general election.

, the Mayor of the Borough of Hawthorne is Republican John V. Lane, whose term of office ends December 31, 2025. Members of the Hawthorne Borough Council are Bruce A. Bennett (R, at-large, 2025), Rayna Laiosa (R, Ward 2, 2023), Frank E. Matthews (R, Ward 4, 2023), Dominic Mele (R, at-large, 2025), Ann Marie Sasso (R, at-large, 2025), Michael Sciarra (R, Ward 3, 2023; elected to serve an unexpired term) and Joseph R. Wojtecki (D, Ward 1, 2023).

In January 2020, the Borough Council appointed Michael Sciarra to fill the Ward 3 expiring in December 2023 that had been won by Garret G. Sinning, who died two weeks after winning re-election; Sciarra served on an interim basis until the November 2020 general election, when voters chose him to serve the balance of the term of office.

On July 29, 2008, former Mayor Patrick Botbyl announced he would resign effective August 15, 2008. A special election was held on November 4, 2008, in which Republican Richard Goldberg defeated Democrat Joseph Wojtecki to become the mayor of Hawthorne for the remainder of Botbyl's term.

Emergency services
The Hawthorne Police Department is Led by its Chief James W. Knepper, who oversees two Captains, six Lieutenants, six Sergeants, 18 patrol and traffic officers and three detectives. The Police Headquarters is located at 445 Lafayette Avenue. The police department maintains several special units including K-9, motorcycle, quality of life, education and firearms. The department runs many community programs such as the Junior Police Academy, Citizen's Police Academy, ROAR Education, and a high school Criminal Justice program.

The Hawthorne Volunteer Fire Department, established in 1916, is an all-volunteer department, which maintains five stations. HFD staffs three Engines (Engine 1, Engine 3, Engine 4), one Platform Aerial (Tower 2), and a Heavy Rescue (Rescue 5). HFD has one Department Chief and five Assistant Chiefs. The Fire Department Headquarters is located at 828 Lafayette Avenue.

The Hawthorne Volunteer Ambulance Corps is an independent non-profit corporation dedicated to providing emergency medical services (EMS) to the Borough of Hawthorne and surrounding communities since 1932. HVAC maintains three full-size BLS units, one First Responder/Command Vehicle, and one chief's vehicle. The EMS Headquarters is located at 970 Goffle Road.

The Passaic County S.P.C.A. Humane Police Department is a law enforcement agency that is specifically empowered to enforce animal cruelty laws throughout Passaic County. Operating since the 1890s, the Passaic County S.P.C.A. relocated to Hawthorne in October 2017. The PCSPCA Humane Police Department maintains two black and white patrol vehicles. PCSPCA Headquarters is located at 794 Lafayette Avenue.

Federal, state and county representation
Hawthorne is located in the 9th Congressional District and is part of New Jersey's 38th state legislative district. Prior to the 2011 reapportionment following the 2010 Census, Hawthorne had been in the 35th state legislative district.

 

Passaic County is governed by Board of County Commissioners, comprised of seven members who are elected at-large to staggered three-year terms office on a partisan basis, with two or three seats coming up for election each year as part of the November general election in a three-year cycle. At a reorganization meeting held in January, the board selects a Director and deputy director from among its members to serve for a one-year term. 
, Passaic County's Commissioners are 
Director Bruce James (D, Clifton, term as commissioner ends December 31, 2023; term as director ends 2022),
Deputy Director Cassandra "Sandi" Lazzara (D, Little Falls, term as commissioner ends 2024; term as deputy director ends 2022),
John W. Bartlett (D, Wayne, 2024),
Theodore O. "T.J." Best Jr. (D, Paterson, 2023),
Terry Duffy (D, West Milford, 2022),
Nicolino Gallo (R, Totowa, 2024) and 
Pasquale "Pat" Lepore (D, Woodland Park, 2022).
Constitutional officers, elected on a countywide basis are
County Clerk Danielle Ireland-Imhof (D, Hawthorne, 2023),
Sheriff Richard H. Berdnik (D, Clifton, 2022) and 
Surrogate Zoila S. Cassanova (D, Wayne, 2026).

Politics
As of March 2011, there were a total of 12,060 registered voters in Hawthorne, of which 2,938 (24.4% vs. 31.0% countywide) were registered as Democrats, 3,934 (32.6% vs. 18.7%) were registered as Republicans and 5,181 (43.0% vs. 50.3%) were registered as Unaffiliated. There were 7 voters registered as Libertarians or Greens. Among the borough's 2010 Census population, 64.2% (vs. 53.2% in Passaic County) were registered to vote, including 81.7% of those ages 18 and over (vs. 70.8% countywide).

In the 2012 presidential election, Democrat Barack Obama received 49.9% of the vote (4,195 cast), ahead of Republican Mitt Romney with 48.9% (4,114 votes), and other candidates with 1.2% (101 votes), among the 8,480 ballots cast by the borough's 12,679 registered voters (70 ballots were spoiled), for a turnout of 66.9%. In the 2008 presidential election, Republican John McCain received 4,618 votes (50.6% vs. 37.7% countywide), ahead of Democrat Barack Obama with 4,256 votes (46.6% vs. 58.8%) and other candidates with 78 votes (0.9% vs. 0.8%), among the 9,132 ballots cast by the borough's 12,101 registered voters, for a turnout of 75.5% (vs. 70.4% in Passaic County). In the 2004 presidential election, Republican George W. Bush received 4,614 votes (52.7% vs. 42.7% countywide), ahead of Democrat John Kerry with 3,863 votes (44.1% vs. 53.9%) and other candidates with 52 votes (0.6% vs. 0.7%), among the 8,753 ballots cast by the borough's 11,624 registered voters, for a turnout of 75.3% (vs. 69.3% in the whole county).

In the 2013 gubernatorial election, Republican Chris Christie received 62.0% of the vote (3,385 cast), ahead of Democrat Barbara Buono with 36.9% (2,015 votes), and other candidates with 1.2% (63 votes), among the 5,586 ballots cast by the borough's 12,874 registered voters (123 ballots were spoiled), for a turnout of 43.4%. In the 2009 gubernatorial election, Republican Chris Christie received 3,139 votes (53.7% vs. 43.2% countywide), ahead of Democrat Jon Corzine with 2,324 votes (39.8% vs. 50.8%), Independent Chris Daggett with 265 votes (4.5% vs. 3.8%) and other candidates with 36 votes (0.6% vs. 0.9%), among the 5,844 ballots cast by the borough's 11,836 registered voters, yielding a 49.4% turnout (vs. 42.7% in the county).

Education
The Hawthorne Public Schools serve public school students in pre-kindergarten through twelfth grade. As of the 2018–19 school year, the district, comprised of five schools, had an enrollment of 2,323 students and 200.8 classroom teachers (on an FTE basis), for a student–teacher ratio of 11.6:1. Schools in the district (with 2018–19 enrollment data from the National Center for Education Statistics) are 
Jefferson Elementary School (288 students; in grades K–5), 
Roosevelt Elementary School (523; Pre-K–5), 
Washington Elementary School (270; K–5), 
Lincoln Middle School (521; 6–8) and 
Hawthorne High School (688; 9–12).

St. Anthony School, a K–8 Catholic school that opened in 1912, operates under the supervision of the Roman Catholic Diocese of Paterson. Hawthorne Christian Academy is an interdenominational evangelical Christian school established in 1981 by the Hawthorne Gospel Church, serving students in preschool through twelfth grade.

Transportation

Roads and highways

Several major roadways pass through the borough. Route 208 is the main state highway serving Hawthorne. Other significant roads passing through Hawthorne include County Route 504.

Public transportation
NJ Transit provides train service at the Hawthorne station providing service on the Main Line to Secaucus Junction and Hoboken Terminal.

NJ Transit provides bus service on the 148 route to the Port Authority Bus Terminal in Midtown Manhattan, with local service on the 722 route.

Community
Hawthorne is home to the Hawthorne Caballeros Drum and Bugle Corps, which was founded in 1946 and competes as an all-age corps in Drum Corps Associates, Headquartered at Hawthorne's American Legion Post 199, the Hawthorne Caballeros have won six world championships and more than a dozen state titles.

Notable people

People who were born in, residents of, or otherwise closely associated with Hawthorne include:
 Bennie Borgmann (1898–1978), professional baseball and basketball player and coach who was inducted into the Naismith Memorial Basketball Hall of Fame
 Maurice Carthon (born 1961), former running back for the New York Giants
 Fulvio Cecere (born 1960), actor
 Beth Fowler (born 1940), actress
 Maria Mazziotti Gillan (born 1940), poet, professor and editor; winner of an American Book Award (2008)
 John Girgenti (born 1947), New Jersey State Senator from the 35th Legislative District
 Debbie Harry (born 1945), rock and roll musician who originally gained fame as the front-woman for the new wave band Blondie
 Don La Greca (born 1968), co-host of ESPN New York's The Michael Kay Show
 Dale Memmelaar (born 1937), offensive lineman who played in the NFL from 1959 through 1967
 Russ Meneve, stand-up comedian
 Roberta Naas (born 1958), journalist
 Ivan Sergei (born 1972), television actor
 C. Alfred Voegeli (1904–1984), bishop of the Episcopal Diocese of Haiti, serving from 1943 to 1971

References

External links

 Hawthorne Borough website

 
1898 establishments in New Jersey
Boroughs in Passaic County, New Jersey
Faulkner Act (mayor–council)
Populated places established in 1898